College Station is a city in Brazos County, Texas, situated in East-Central Texas in the heart of the Brazos Valley, towards the eastern edge of the region known as the Texas Triangle. As of the 2020 census, College Station had a population of 120,511. College Station and Bryan make up the Bryan-College Station metropolitan area, the 13th-largest metropolitan area in Texas with 273,101 people as of 2019.

College Station is home to the main campus of Texas A&M University, the flagship institution of the Texas A&M University System. The city owes its name and existence to the university's location along a railroad. Texas A&M's triple designation as a Land-, Sea-, and Space-Grant institution reflects the broad scope of the research endeavors it brings to the city, with ongoing projects funded by agencies such as NASA, the National Institutes of Health, the National Science Foundation, and the Office of Naval Research.

History

College Station's origins date from 1860, when the Houston and Texas Central Railway began to build through the region. Eleven years later, the site was chosen as the location for the proposed Agricultural and Mechanical College of Texas, a land-grant school. In 1876, as the nation celebrated its centennial, the school (renamed Texas A&M University in 1963) opened its doors as the first public institution of higher education in the state of Texas.

College Station's population grew slowly, reaching 350 in 1884 and 391 at the turn of the century. However, during this time, transportation improvements took place in the town. In 1900, the I&GN Railroad was extended to College Station (the Missouri Pacific Railroad Company abandoned the line in 1965), and 10 years later, electric interurban service was established between Texas A&M and the neighboring town of Bryan. A city bus system replaced the interurban in the 1920s.

In 1930, the community to the north of College Station, known as North Oakwood, was incorporated as part of Bryan. College Station did not incorporate until 1938, with John H. Binney as the first mayor. Within a year, the city established a zoning commission, and by 1940, the population had reached 2,184.

The city grew under the leadership of Ernest Langford, called by some the "Father of College Station", who began a 26-year stretch as mayor in 1942. Early in his first term, the city adopted a council-manager system of city government.

Population growth accelerated following World War II as the nonstudent population reached 7,898 in 1950, 11,396 in 1960, 17,676 in 1970, 30,449 in 1980, 52,456 in 1990, and 67,890 in 2000. The Bryan-College Station metropolitan area's population crossed 270,000 people in 2018.

In the 1990s, College Station and Texas A&M University drew national attention when the George Bush Presidential Library opened in 1997. Attention was drawn again in 1999, when 12 people were killed and 27 injured when the Aggie Bonfire collapsed while being constructed.

In 2022, it became one of the first areas served by Amazon's Prime Air drone delivery service, along with Lockeford, California.

Geography
College Station is south of the center of Brazos County at  (30.601433, –96.314464). It is bordered by the city of Bryan to the northwest.

Climate
The local climate is subtropical and winters are mild with periods of low temperatures usually lasting less than two months, while summers are hot and humid.

Snow and ice are rare; most recently, College Station received  of snowfall on January 10, 2021.

Summers are hot and humid with occasional showers being the only real variation in weather.
 Average annual rainfall: 39 in (1000 mm)
 Average elevation: 367 ft (112 m) above sea level
 Average Temperature: 
 Agricultural Resources: Cattle, corn, cotton, eggs, hay, sorghum
 Mineral Resources: Sand, gravel, lignite, gas, oil

Districts

Northgate
Northgate is a mixed-use district north of Texas A&M University that features a combination of businesses, restaurants, apartments, churches, and entertainment. It is known for its eclectic mix of restaurants and bars. A large portion of the stores, bars, and restaurants in Northgate are frequented, patronized, and staffed by Texas A&M students. The district is the home of the Dixie Chicken and of the first Texas location for the regional fast-food chain Freebirds World Burrito.

Northgate's roots started in the 1930s as the city began enjoying rapid population growth from the influx of Texas A&M University students, professors, and their families. Realizing that proximity to the campus would be a boon for revenues, the first business district was established in College Station near the campus, taking its name for the closest on-campus landmark: the north gate. When the city was incorporated in 1938, its first City Hall was opened in the new district. In 1994, restoration efforts began to revitalize the ailing area. A four-day music festival, "North By Northgate", was introduced in 1998 and has become an annual tradition, renamed the "Northgate Music Festival" in 2002. In 2006, the city council incorporated Northgate as a special tax zone to finance additional improvements and expansions.

Live music is a major draw to the Northgate area. Many well-known musicians, especially in the Texas country music scene, initially performed in the Northgate area. Notable names include Robert Earl Keen, Grammy award-winner Lyle Lovett, Dub Miller, and Roger Creager. The district is bisected to the north by Church Street, made famous by the Robert Earl Keen and Lyle Lovett duet "The Front Porch Song".

Wolf Pen Creek District

Wolf Pen Creek District is a large commercial development adjacent to Post Oak Mall and between two of the city's main commercial thoroughfares: Earl Rudder Freeway and Texas Avenue. The area consists of a greenway with trails, a $1.5 million amphitheater and entertainment area, a small lake, the Spirit Ice Arena, and is the home of the Arts Council of the Brazos Valley. The amphitheater has hosted a variety of musical events, including the annual Starlight Music Series, a concert series that starts in late spring and runs through late summer.

Wellborn District
Wellborn became a community in 1867 as a construction camp on the Houston and Texas Central Railroad. The town's name has been attributed to a well at the construction camp, a foreman named E.W. Wellborn, or a landowner named W.W. Willburn. Also in 1867, a post office opened in the community under the name Wellborn Station. In 1870, the name was shortened to Wellborn. On April 14, 2011, the City Council of College Station voted 5–2 to annex Wellborn, thus making the community the Wellborn district. Wellborn is often mispronounced as 'well-born' but is pronounced by locals as 'Well-burn'.

Demographics

As of the 2020 United States census, there were 120,511 people, 41,682 households, and 20,487 families residing in the city.

As of the census of 2000, 67,890 people, 24,691 households, and 10,370 families resided in the city.
Of the 24,691 households, 21.0% had children under the age of 18 living with them, 32.2% were married couples living together, 6.8% had a female householder with no husband present, and 58.0% were not families. About 27.1% of all households were made up of individuals, and 2.4% had someone living alone who was 65 years of age or older. The average household size was 2.32 and the average family size was 2.98. The racial makeup of the city as of 2019 was 77.45% White, 7.74% African American, 0.30% Native American, 10.25% Asian, 0.08% Pacific Islander, 6.32% from other races, and 2.3% from two or more races. Hispanic or Latino of any ethnicity/nationality were 15.6% of the population.

In the city, the population was distributed as 14.4% under the age of 18, 51.2% from 18 to 24, 21.3% from 25 to 44, 9.4% from 45 to 64, and 3.6% who were 65 years of age or older. The median age was 22 years. For every 100 females, there were 104.3 males. For every 100 females age 18 and over, there were 104.0 males.

The median income for a household in the city was $21,180, and for a family was $53,147. Males had a median income of $38,216 versus $26,592 for females. The per capita income for the city was $15,170. About 15.4% of families and 37.4% of the population were below the poverty line, including 16.4% of those under age 18 and 7.7% of those age 65 or over.

Government
The city of College Station has a council-manager form of government. Voters elect the members of a city council, who pass laws and make policy. The council hires a professional city manager who is responsible for day-to-day operations of the city and its public services.

The Texas Department of Criminal Justice (TDCJ) operates the Bryan District Parole Office in College Station.

The United States Postal Service operates the College Station and Northgate College Station post offices.

Business parks
 Business Center at College Station
 A , class "A" business center  from the university, its current residents include firms involved in telecommunications, software development, and oilfield services.
 Spring Creek Corporate Campus
 A , class "A" business center, a greenbelt surrounds most of the campus and provides a buffer between the new development and adjacent land uses which include the Pebble Creek Country Club and Woodland Hills Subdivision.
 Texas A&M University Research Park
 This  research park was established to provide businesses direct partnering opportunities with Texas A&M University. Several companies and nonprofit research interests have located in the park, including Schlumberger, Lynntech, AdventGX, Notequill, AskU, Improving Enterprises, the Institute of Food Science and Engineering, the Human Behavior Laboratory, the Electron Beam Food Research Facility, the Academy of Advanced Telecommunications and Learning Technologies, and the International Ocean Discovery Program.
 Crescent Pointe

Economy

As of May 2008, the local unemployment hovered around 3 to 4%, among the lowest in Texas. This rate is largely attributed to the significant role the university plays in the local economy. However, underemployment is an ongoing issue.

Major employers

 Texas A&M University System – education – 16,248
 Bryan Independent School District – education – 1,952
 St. Joseph Regional Health Center – health services – 1,590
 Sanderson Farms – poultry processing – 1,539
 College Station Independent School District – education – 1,400
 Reynolds and Reynolds/Rentsys – computer hardware/software – 959
 City of Bryan – government – 889
 City of College Station – government – 865
 Walmart – retail – 650
 Ply Gem – windows – 611
 H-E-B Grocery – retail – 590

Headquarters

Until its 2007 acquisition by Tavistock Group, Freebirds World Burrito had its corporate headquarters in College Station.

Post Oak Mall

Post Oak Mall was the city's first mall and is currently the largest mall in the Brazos Valley. The  mall is home to 125 stores; its opening on February 17, 1982, helped create the impetus for growing economic and commercial developments for College Station. It is currently the largest taxpayer in College Station and the second-largest in the Brazos Valley, though the anchor stores are free-standing units that are privately owned and taxed separate from the mall proper. Over 75% of retail sales in the Brazos Valley come from sales at the mall's stores.

Sports facilities
 Football: Kyle Field (capacity: 102,733 <106,000 in 2014 only, during reconstruction>)
 Racing: Texas World Speedway (capacity: 23,000) (Closed as of 2022)
 Basketball/Volleyball: Reed Arena (largest crowd: 13,657 for basketball)
 Baseball: Olsen Field (largest crowd: 11,052)
 Soccer: Ellis Field (largest crowd: 8,204)
 Track and field: Anderson Track and Field Complex (capacity: 3,500)
 Tennis: George P. Mitchell Tennis Center (largest crowd: 2,339)
 Softball: Davis Diamond (largest crowd: 2,455) 
 Hockey: Spirit Ice Arena (capacity: 500)
 Golf: Texas A&M Traditions Club
 Golf: City Course at Phillips Event Center 
 Bowling: Grand Station Entertainment (capacity: 800+)

Media and journalism

Television stations
The only full power local commercial television station is CBS affiliate KBTX, which also broadcasts a CW channel. Waco-based KCEN operates a semi-satellite low power NBC channel, KAGS providing local news, weather and sports. ABC affiliate KRHD and Fox affiliate KWKT air coverage originating in Waco. PBS affiliate KAMU, which is owned by Texas A&M University, is also based in College Station.

Radio stations
College Station is part of the Bryan-College Station Arbitron market #238.
KAMU-FM 90.9 NPR affiliate and sister station to KAMU-TV
KEOS 89.1 Community Radio for the Brazos Valley
KAGG 96.1 Country music radio station serving Bryan-College Station, Madisonville, and surrounding areas.

Area newspapers
 The Bryan-College Station Eagle (city newspaper)
 The Battalion (Texas A&M University newspaper)
 La Voz Hispana (Spanish language weekly newspaper serving Bryan/College Station)
 Maroon Weekly (Aggie-owned and operated independent newspaper, Bryan/College Station)
 The Touchstone (left/progressive, alt/indie newspaper)
 The Jail Times (Locally owned and operated independent newspaper, Bryan/College Station)

Area magazines
 12th Man Magazine
 Aggieland Illustrated
 Insite Magazine
 AgriLeader Magazine
 Brazos Valley Bride
 Brazos Family
 Brazos Wellness
 Peace Brazos Christian Life Magazine
 Hola Brazos Valley (Spanish language magazine)

Education

Local colleges and universities
 Texas A&M University
 Texas A&M Health Science Center

The service area of Blinn College includes all of Brazos County. Blinn operates a campus in nearby Bryan.

Local school districts

Almost all of College Station is within the College Station Independent School District, while small sections are in Bryan Independent School District. College Station ISD operates two high schools: A&M Consolidated High School and College Station High School.

Students living in the portion of Bryan ISD located in the City of College Station are zoned for: Stephen F. Austin Middle School, and Bryan High School.

Transportation

Mass transit
 The Brazos Transit District (formerly Brazos Valley Transit Authority) provides public bus transportation in the Bryan/College Station area.
 Texas A&M Transportation Services provides bus transportation throughout College Station and Bryan for students, faculty, and staff of Texas A&M University and Blinn College. On Texas A&M football game days, the department provides additional park-and-ride service to and from Kyle Field.
 Starline Travel offers weekend service from Texas A&M's campus to downtown Houston, with additional Houston service for Aggie game days and additional service to Dallas during major A&M breaks.
 Groundshuttle provides daily shuttles to and from Houston airports (Hobby and Bush).

Major roads

 State Highway 6: Earl Rudder Freeway (East Bypass)
 State Highway 6 Business: Texas Avenue
 State Highway 30: Harvey Road
 State Highway 40: William D. Fitch Parkway
 State Highway 47: Riverside Parkway

 State Highway 308: College Avenue
 Farm to Market Road 60: University Drive / Raymond Stotzer Parkway
 Farm to Market Road 2154: Wellborn Road
 Farm to Market Road 2347: George Bush Drive
 Farm to Market Road 2818: Harvey Mitchell Parkway (West Bypass)

Railroads
 Union Pacific Railroad line: Union Pacific Corporation (NYSE: UNP), over former tracks of the Southern Pacific Railroad, which operated the Sunbeam passenger train to 1957. Amtrak ran a section of the Texas Eagle over that route from 1988 to 1995.
 Texas Central Railway is projected to operate a Dallas-Houston high-speed train making a stop in the Brazos Valley, 25 miles to the east, estimated in 2026.

Airport
Easterwood Airport, owned by Texas A&M, is located three miles (5 km) southwest of College Station and has flights to Dallas/Fort Worth International Airport.

Notable people

The following people have lived or are currently living in College Station:
 George Bass, archaeologist, called the Father of Underwater Archaeology
 David Bereit, anti-abortion activist
 Matthew Berry, ESPN fantasy sport analyst and son of College Station mayor Nancy Berry
 Norman Borlaug, "The Man Who Saved a Billion Lives", agronomist, humanitarian, and Nobel laureate who has been called "the father of the Green Revolution"
 Alex Caruso, professional NBA basketball player
 John David Crow, late athletic director at Texas A&M University; former football player and coach
 Larry Fedora, former head football coach of the University of North Carolina
 Robert Gates, former Texas A&M University president and former Secretary of Defense
 Kristy Hawkins, IFBB professional bodybuilder
 Kyle Kacal, member of the Texas House of Representatives from College Station since 2013
 David Konderla, Roman Catholic Bishop of Tulsa
 Arnold Krammer, historian at TAMU, 1974–retirement in 2015
 David M. Lee, physics professor at TAMU, 1996 Nobel Prize Laureate in Physics
 R. Bowen Loftin, former president of Texas A&M University
 Lyle Lovett, singer-songwriter
 Seth McKinney, former NFL football player and now owner of Crossfit Aggieland in College Station
 Ilan Mitchell-Smith, actor, starring in Weird Science, Journey to the Center of the Earth, among others; professor of English at California State University, Long Beach
 John N. Raney, member of the Texas House of Representatives from College Station since 2011, owner of Aggieland Book Store since 1969
 Rico Rodriguez, actor, known for his role of Manny Delgado in the ABC sitcom Modern Family
 Thomas Sadoski, award-winning actor, starring in HBO's The Newsroom, among others
 Brek Shea, soccer player, member of FC Dallas and the United States Men's National Soccer Team
 R. C. Slocum, former Texas A&M University head football coach (1989–2002)
 Bjarne Stroustrup, computer scientist, designer, and original implementor of C++; Distinguished Professor at Texas A&M University; AT&T Fellow
 Tiffany Thornton, actress, starring in Disney Channel's Sonny With a Chance
 Eleanor Joyce Toliver-Williams, the first Certified African American Female Federal Aviation Administration Controller
 Alok Vaid-Menon, performance artist and LGBTQ rights activist
 Christine Wormuth, currently serving as the 25th United States Secretary of the Army
 Patrick Zurek, Roman Catholic Bishop of Amarillo, founding pastor of St. Thomas Aquinas Parish

Points of interest
 George Bush Presidential Library, located at 1000 George Bush Drive West.
The Day the Wall Came Down, 1997 sculpture
 D. A. "Andy" Anderson Arboretum
Museum of the American GI
Santa's Wonderland
Bonfire Memorial 
Peach Creek Vineyards
Disaster City
The Gardens at Texas A&M University

Notes

References

External links

 
 Bryan-College Station Visitors & Convention Bureau
 Bryan-College Station Chamber of Commerce

 
Cities in Texas
Cities in Brazos County, Texas